George Godfrey (26 July 1888 – 22 May 1965) was a South African swimmer. He competed in the men's 400 metre freestyle event at the 1912 Summer Olympics.

References

1888 births
1965 deaths
South African male swimmers
Olympic swimmers of South Africa
Swimmers at the 1912 Summer Olympics
Sportspeople from Durban
Colony of Natal people